Indrajit Hazra is an Indian journalist and author of the books The Bioscope Man and Grand Delusions: A Short Biography of Kolkata published by Aleph Book Company in 2013.

He was born and raised in Kolkata and studied at La Martiniere Calcutta and Jadavpur University.

He is currently editor of Hindustan Times

References

Indian male journalists
Indian male novelists
Living people
21st-century Indian novelists
Hindustan Times journalists
20th-century Indian journalists
20th-century Indian male writers
21st-century Indian male writers
Journalists from West Bengal
1971 births